The Dacian fortress of Iedera de Jos is located within the county of Dâmbovița, Romania.

References

Dacian fortresses in Dâmbovița County
History of Muntenia